Azenia was a deme of ancient Attica between Anaphlystus and Sunium. 

It was probably situated in the bay of which Sunium forms the eastern cape. Opposite this bay is a small island, now called Patroklos (or Gaidouronisi), formerly the Island or Rampart of Patroclus (Πατρόκλου χάραξ or νῆσος), because a fortress was built upon it by Patroclus, who commanded on one occasion the ships of Ptolemy Philadelphus.

People
Aristophon of Azenia

References

Populated places in ancient Attica
Former populated places in Greece
Demoi
Lost ancient cities and towns